or NPB is the highest level of baseball in Japan. Locally, it is often called , meaning Professional Baseball. Outside of Japan, it is often just referred to as "Japanese baseball". 

The organization that is today's NPB was formed when the JBL reorganized in 1950, creating two leagues with six teams each in the Central League and the Pacific League with an annual season-ending Japan Series championship play-off series of games starting that year.

The NPB also oversees the Western League and the Eastern League, NPB's affiliated minor leagues.

Entering the 2023 season, the Orix Buffaloes, who defeated the Tokyo Yakult Swallows 4–2–1 in the 2022 Japan Series, are the reigning champions. The Japan Series has been contested 73 times as of 2022, with the Pacific League winning 37 and the Central League winning 36.

League structure
Nippon Professional Baseball consists of two leagues, the Central League and the Pacific League, which each have six teams. There are also two secondary-level professional minor leagues, the Eastern League and the Western League, that play shorter schedules for developing players. NPB teams are allowed to have more than one minor league team as long as they are outside of the established minor league system, with the Fukuoka SoftBank Hawks and Yomiuri Giants being the only teams taking advantage of this. As of 2023, the Hawks have three minor league teams, the Giants have two, and the other ten teams only have one minor league team each. Teams below the Eastern and Western Leagues play exhibition matches against various collegiate, industrial, Shikoku Island League Plus, and other NPB minor league teams.

The Central League and Pacific League operate as separate entities, unlike the four major professional sports leagues of North America whose leagues operate as one singular entity. TV rights for games are always held by a game's home team. The Pacific League has used the designated hitter (DH) rule since 1975, while the Central League has not used the DH outside of interleague play where a Pacific League team is the home team and in the 1985 Japan Series.

The season starts in late March or early April, and ends in October, with two or three all-star games in July. In recent decades prior to 2007, the two leagues each scheduled between 130 and 140 regular season games, with the 146 games played by the Central League in 2005 and 2006 being the only exception. Both leagues have since adopted 143-game seasons, 71 or 72 each at home and on road, facing their five respective intra-league opponents 25 times each and facing their six interleague opponents three times each in late May to early June in interleague play, with a separate champion being crowned for the team with the best record through the 18 games of interleague play. In general, Japanese teams play six games a week, with every Monday off (except on specific occasions, such as a game being played outside of the home team's primary stadium or if a rainout forced a game to be postponed to a Monday). Unlike in Major League Baseball, doubleheaders have not been featured in NPB since the late 1990s.

Following the conclusion of each regular season, the top three teams from each league go on to play in the Climax Series championship play-off tournament, with the winner of each play-off tournament facing off in a best-of-seven championship series known as the Japan Series (known locally as the Nippon Series). In the case of an instance where the series ends 1–1–1, the higher seed always advances to the Final Stage. In the "Final Stage", the winner of the First Stage will face off against the league's pennant winner in a best-of-six series played entirely in the pennant winner's home stadium. The higher seed always starts with a "ghost win", or a 1–0 advantage in the series before any games have been played, meaning the higher seed only has to win three games whereas the lower seed has to win four games. In the event of a tie, the higher seed would subsequently only need to win two games. The winners of each league's Final Stage then face off in the Japan Series, a best-of-seven series mirroring the format of the World Series. In the rare instance where the series ends 3–3–1 after seven games, a Game 8 will be played with unlimited innings at the stadium with home-field advantage. Hypothetically, a Japan Series can go up to 14 games in length if each of the first seven games resulted in a 12-inning tie. Since its inception, home-field advantage alternates from year to year between the CL and PL, with the CL representative getting home-field advantage in even years and the PL representative getting home-field advantage in odd years.

Since its adoption by both leagues in 2007, Climax Series does not determine who won each league's pennant, rather the team with the best regular season record in each league wins the pennant, regardless of their result in the Climax Series.

Financial problems
Financial problems plague many teams in the league. It is believed that with the exception of the Yomiuri Giants, Hanshin Tigers, and Fukuoka SoftBank Hawks, all teams are operating with considerable subsidies, often as much as ¥6 billion (about US$73 million), from their parent companies. A raise in the salaries of players is often blamed, but, from the start of the professional league, parent companies paid the difference as an advertisement. Most teams have never tried to improve their finances through constructive marketing. In addition, teams in the Central League historically saw much higher profits than the Pacific League, having popular teams such as the Giants and Tigers.

The number of metropolitan areas represented in the league increased from four to five in 1988, when the Nankai Hawks (now Fukuoka SoftBank Hawks) were sold to Daiei and moved to Fukuoka, nine years after the Nishitetsu Lions moved from Fukuoka to Tokorozawa to become the Seibu Lions, and from five to seven between 2003 and 2005, as the Nippon-Ham Fighters moved from Tokyo to Sapporo prior to the  season. The Osaka Kintetsu Buffaloes merged with the Orix BlueWave (becoming the Orix Buffaloes) in the middle of 2004, which caused a player strike that eventually resulted in the creation of the Tōhoku Rakuten Golden Eagles being founded in Sendai to maintain the 12-team balance before the  season. 

Until 1993, baseball was the only team sport played professionally in Japan. In that year, the J.League professional football league was founded. The new football league placed teams in prefectural capitals around the country—rather than clustering them in and around Tokyo—and the teams were named after their locations rather than after corporate sponsors, despite many clubs in the J.League still being owned and subsidized by corporate entities.

The wave of players moving to Major League Baseball, which began with Hideo Nomo "retiring" from the Kintetsu Buffaloes, then signing with the Los Angeles Dodgers, has also added to the financial problems. Attendance suffered as teams lost their most marketable players, while TV ratings declined as viewers tuned into broadcasts of Major League games. To discourage players from leaving to play in North America, or to at least compensate teams that lose players, Japanese baseball and MLB agreed on a posting system for players under contract. MLB teams wishing to negotiate with a player submit bids for a "posting fee", which the winning MLB team would pay the Japanese team if the player signs with the MLB team. Free agents are not subject to the posting system, however, and some teams almost never post their players.

History

Origins
The first professional baseball team in Japan was founded by media mogul Matsutarō Shōriki in late 1934 and called the Dai Nippon Tokyo Yakyu Kurabu ("the Great Japan Tokyo Baseball Club"). After matching up with a team of visiting American All-Stars that included Babe Ruth, Jimmie Foxx, Lou Gehrig, and Charlie Gehringer, the team spent the 1935 season barnstorming in the U.S., winning 93 of 102 games against semi-pro and Pacific Coast League teams. According to historian Joseph Reaves, "The only minor drawbacks to the team's popularity in the States were their kanji characters and their cumbersome Japanese name. They rectified both by renaming themselves the Tokyo Kyojin ['Tokyo Giants'] and adopting a uniform identical to the New York Giants..."

From 1936 to 1950, professional baseball in Japan was played under the banner of the Japanese Baseball League (JBL). The league's dominant team during this period was the Tokyo Kyojin, which won nine league championships, including six in a row from 1938 to 1943. (The team was officially renamed the Yomiuri Giants in 1947.)

NPB establishment
After the 1949 season, the JBL team owners reorganized into the NPB; Daiei Stars owner Masaichi Nagata promoted a two-league system, which became the Pacific League (initially called the Taiheiyo Baseball Union) and the Central League. (Nagata became the first president of the Pacific League.) The league now known as Nippon Pro Baseball began play in the 1950 season.

Four JBL teams formed the basis of the Central League: the Chunichi Dragons, the Hanshin Tigers, the Yomiuri Giants, and the Shochiku Robins (formerly the Taiyō Robins). To fill out the league, four new teams were formed: the Hiroshima Carp, the Kokutetsu Swallows, the Nishi Nippon Pirates, and the Taiyō Whales.

Four JBL teams formed the basis of the Pacific League: the Hankyu Braves, the Nankai Hawks, the Daiei Stars, and the Tokyu Flyers. To fill out the league, three new teams were formed: the Kintetsu Pearls, the Mainichi Orions, and the Nishitetsu Clippers.

Matsutarō Shōriki, the Giants' owner, acted as NPB's unofficial commissioner and oversaw the first Japan Series, which featured the Mainichi Orions defeating the Shochiku Robins 4 games to 2.

Expansion and contraction
The Central League's Nishi Nippon Pirates existed for one season—they placed sixth in 1950, and the following season merged with the Nishitetsu Clippers (also based in Fukuoka) to form the Nishitetsu Lions. This brought the number of Central League teams down to an ungainly arrangement of seven. In 1952, it was decided that any Central League team ending the season with a winning percentage below .300 would be disbanded or merged with other teams. The Shochiku Robins fell into this category, and were merged with the Taiyō Whales to become the Taiyō Shochiku Robins in January 1953. This enabled the Central League to shrink to an even number of six teams.

In 1954 a new Pacific League team was founded, the Takahashi Unions, to increase the number of teams in that division to eight. Although the team was stocked with players from the other Pacific League teams, the Unions struggled from the outset and finished in the second division every season. In 1957, the Unions were merged with the Daiei Stars to form the Daiei Unions (and again bringing the number of Pacific League teams down to seven). The Unions existed for a single season, finishing in last place, 43-1/2 games out of first. In 1958, the Unions merged with the Mainichi Orions to form the Daimai Orions. This enabled the Pacific League to contract from the ungainly seven-team arrangement to six teams.

After these various franchise developments, by the end of the 1950s Nippon Professional Baseball had contracted from the initial allotment of 15 teams down to the current number of 12.

1960s and 1970s
On September 1, 1964, Nankai Hawks' prospect Masanori Murakami became the first Japanese player to play in Major League Baseball when he appeared on the mound for the San Francisco Giants; he returned to Japan in 1966. Disputes over the rights to his contract eventually led to the 1967 United States – Japanese Player Contract Agreement; it would be almost 30 years before another Japanese player played in the Major Leagues.

Continuing their dominance from the JBL, the Yomiuri Giants won nine consecutive Japan Series championships from 1965 to 1973.

The Black Mist Scandal rocked Nippon Professional Baseball between 1969 and 1971. The fallout from a series of game-fixing scandals resulted in several star players receiving long suspensions, salary cuts, or being banned from professional play entirely; the resulting abandonment of baseball by many fans in Japan also led to the sale of the Nishitetsu Lions and the Toei Flyers.

From 1973 to 1982, in a forerunner to today's Climax Series playoff rounds, the Pacific League employed a split season with the first-half winner playing against the second-half winner in a mini-playoff to determine its champion. In 1975, the Pacific League adopted the designated hitter rule. These were implemented in an attempt to draw fans back to Pacific League, as the Pacific League was hit significantly harder by the Black Mist Scandal than the Central League, with only the Hankyu Braves not having players involved in the incident.

1980s and the "Invincible Seibu" 
After being a second division team for much of the 1960s and 1970s, in 1983 the Seibu Lions began a period of sustained success. The team gained the moniker "Invincible Seibu" during the 1980s and 1990s due to their sustained domination of the league, winning 11 league championships and eight Japan Series championships between 1982 and 1994. The Lions had a powerful lineup in this period, loaded with sluggers such as Koji Akiyama, Kazuhiro Kiyohara, and Orestes Destrade. Their defense also benefited from the services of skilled players such as Hiromichi Ishige, Hatsuhiko Tsuji and catcher Tsutomu Ito. Among the pitchers employed by the Lions in this period was "The Oriental Express" Taigen Kaku, Osamu Higashio, Kimiyasu Kudoh, Hisanobu Watanabe, and relievers Yoshitaka Katori and Tetsuya Shiozaki.

American expatriate players made their mark in NPB in the 1980s, with players like the Lee brothers (Leron Lee and Leon Lee), Greg "Boomer" Wells, Randy Bass, and Ralph Bryant playing key roles on their NPB teams.

Hideo Nomo and the exodus to MLB
In 1995, star pitcher Hideo Nomo "retired" from the Kintetsu Buffaloes and signed with the Los Angeles Dodgers. Nomo pitched over the span of 14 seasons in the Major Leagues before retiring in 2008. He won the Rookie of the Year Award in 1995. He twice led the league in strikeouts, and also threw two no-hitters (the only Japanese pitcher to throw a no-hitter in Major League Baseball until Hisashi Iwakuma achieved the feat in August 2015). Nomo's MLB success led to more NPB players moving to Major League Baseball, and eventually led to the creation of the "posting system" in 1998.

Since Nomo's exodus, more than 60 NPB players have played Major League Baseball. Some of the more notable examples include:
  Ichiro Suzuki – after nine years with the Orix BlueWave, in 2001 Ichiro was posted by the BlueWave and claimed by MLB's Seattle Mariners. The first Japanese-born position player to be signed to the major leagues, Ichiro led the American League (AL) in batting average and stolen bases en route to being named AL Rookie of the Year and AL Most Valuable Player. Ichiro, a member of MLB's 3,000-hit club, has established a number of MLB batting records, including the single-season record for hits with 262. He had ten consecutive 200-hit seasons, the longest streak by any player in history. Between his career hits in Japan's and America's major leagues, Ichiro has the most all-time top-flight hits. On August 27, 2022, Ichiro was enshrined in the Seattle Mariners Hall of Fame.
 Hideki Matsui – the slugger played ten seasons for the Yomiuri Giants, and then in 2003 moved to MLB, where he starred for the New York Yankees for seven more seasons, including being named the Most Valuable Player for the 2009 World Series. He was the first power hitter from Japan to succeed in Major League Baseball.
 Kazuhiro Sasaki – a closer famed for his splitter, known as "The Fang". In 2000, he won the American League Rookie of the Year Award after saving 37 games for the Mariners. In 2001, he was a vital contributor to the Mariners' extremely strong team that won an American League record 116 games, of which he saved 45. In 2001 and 2002, he was an All-Star. After 2003, he returned to Japan to pitch in the NPB until his retirement in 2005.
 Kazuo Matsui – after eight stellar seasons with the Seibu Lions, Matsui signed with the New York Mets on December 15, 2003, in 2004 becoming the first Japanese infielder to play with a Major League Baseball team. His seven seasons in Major League Baseball were not as successful, and he later returned to NPB. Matsui now resides as the manager of his former Lions team.
 Shohei Ohtani – a two-way player who was a five-time All-Star while playing for the Hokkaido Nippon-Ham Fighters. After signing with the Los Angeles Angels, Ohtani won the 2018 AL Rookie of the Year award. In 2021, he became the first player in MLB history to be named an All-Star as both a pitcher and a position player. After the conclusion of the season, Ohtani was unanimously named the AL Most Valuable Player.

Merger and strike of 2004

In September 2004, the professional Japanese players went on strike for the first time in over 70 years. The strike arose from a dispute that took place between the owners of the 12 professional Japanese baseball teams and the players' union (which was led by popular Yakult Swallows player-manager Atsuya Furuta), concerning the merging of the Osaka Kintetsu Buffaloes and the Orix BlueWave. The owners wanted to get rid of the financially defunct Buffaloes, and merge the two baseball leagues, since teams in the Central League saw much higher profits than the Pacific League, having popular teams such as the Yomiuri Giants and Hanshin Tigers. After negotiations, the owners agreed to guarantee the survival of the Chiba Lotte Marines and the Fukuoka Daiei Hawks, leaving the Central League with six teams and the Pacific League with five.

A battle escalated between the players union and the owners, and reached its height when Yomiuri Giants owner Tsuneo Watanabe controversially remarked that Furuta was "a mere player", implying that players had no say in what league would look like the next year. The dispute received huge press coverage (which mostly favored Furuta and the players' union) and was dubbed one of the biggest events in the history of Japanese baseball. Proposals and amendments concerning interleague games, player drafting, and management were also discussed between the players union and the owners during this period.

The strike was originally planned for all Saturday and Sunday games that month, starting from September 11, but was pushed back due to the agreement of another meeting between the union and the owners on September 10. The players decided to strike on September 18–19, 2004, when no progress was made in the negotiations, as there was insufficient time left in the season to hold discussions.

The dispute officially ended after the two groups reached consensus on September 23, 2004. As part of the agreement, the Buffaloes were allowed to merge with the Blue Wave (forming into the Orix Buffaloes); in addition, the Rakuten Golden Eagles were newly created (at a reduced "entry fee") to keep the former six-team league structure. Other agreements included the leagues adopting interleague play to help the Pacific League gain exposure by playing the more popular Central league teams. All these changes took place before the 2005 season.

Interleague play

The two leagues began interleague play in 2005, with each team playing two three-game series (one home, one away) against each of the six teams in the other league. This was reduced to two two-game series in 2007. All interleague play games are played in a seven-week span near the middle of the season.

As of the end of the 2017 season, the Pacific League has won the most games in interleague play since it began in 2005 twelve times, with 2009 being the only time that the Central League has won more games.

League championship series/Climax Series

After 2004, a three-team playoff system was introduced in the Pacific League, dubbed the "Pacific League Championship Series". The teams with the second- and third-best records play in the three-game first stage, with the winner advancing to the five-game final against the top team. The winner becomes the representative of the Pacific League to the Japan Series.

Since the Pacific League won every Japan Series after introducing this league playoff system, an identical system was introduced to the Central League in 2007, and the post-season intra-league games were renamed the "Climax Series" in both leagues. Player statistics and drafting order based on team records are not affected by these postseason games.

Recent history
In 2011 Miyagi Baseball Stadium, home of the Rakuten Eagles, was badly damaged by the Tōhoku earthquake and tsunami.

The 2013 season featured a livelier baseball which was secretly introduced into NPB, resulting in a marked increase in home runs league-wide. Tokyo Yakult Swallows outfielder Wladimir Balentien broke the NPB single-season home run record of 55, previously held by professional baseball's all-time home run leader Sadaharu Oh in 1964, Tuffy Rhodes in 2001, and Alex Cabrera in 2002. Balantien finished the season with 60 home runs. Three-term NPB commissioner Ryōzō Katō was forced to resign over the scandal when the changed baseball was revealed.

Former Prime Minister Shinzō Abe's ruling Liberal Democratic Party has proposed expanding NPB to 16 total teams by adding two expansion franchises in each of the country's top-tier professional baseball leagues. The goal of such a move would be to energize the economies of the regions receiving the new teams. Okinawa, Shizuoka, Shikoku, and Niigata have been identified as regions that could play host to said teams.

The 2020 NPB season was delayed numerous times due to the COVID-19 pandemic. Initially preseason games were set to be played without spectators, but with opening day of March 20 remaining unchanged. With the lifting of states of emergency over major Japanese cities, NPB announced that it would begin its regular season on 19 June behind closed doors. "Warm-up" games began 26 May. The shortened 120-game regular season began on 19 June. On 10 July NPB began allowing a limited number of fans to attend games, with plans to further ease restrictions in the near future. On 19 September, attendance was expanded to a maximum of 20,000 fans per game, or 50% of stadium capacity.

Expatriate baseball players in Japan

For most of its history, NPB regulations imposed "gaijin waku", a limit on the number of non-Japanese people per team to two or three—including the manager and/or coaching staff. Even today, a team cannot have more than four foreign players on a 25-man game roster, although there is no limit on the number of foreign players that it may sign. If there are four, they cannot all be pitchers nor all be position players. This limits the cost and competition for expensive players of other nationalities, and is similar to rules in many European sports leagues' roster limits on non-European players.

Nonetheless, expatriate baseball players in Japan have been a feature of the Japanese professional leagues since 1934. Hundreds of foreigners—particularly Americans—have played NPB. Taiwanese nationals Shosei Go and Hiroshi Oshita both starred in the 1940s. American players began to steadily find spots on NPB rosters in the 1960s. American players hold several NPB records, including highest career batting average (Leron Lee, .334), highest single-season batting average (Randy Bass, .389), and the dubious record of most strikeouts in a season by a hitter (Ralph Bryant, 204). Americans rank #3 (Tuffy Rhodes, 55) and #5 (Randy Bass, 54) on the list of most home runs in a season, and #2 in single-season RBI (Bobby Rose, 153). Curaçaoan–Dutch outfielder Wladimir Balentien holds the NPB single-season home run record with 60 round-trippers in 2013.

Koreans have had an impact in the NPB as well, including such standout players as Lee Seung-yuop, Sun Dong-yol, Baek In-chun, Lee Jong-beom, and Dae-ho Lee. Venezuelans Alex Ramírez, Alex Cabrera, Bobby Marcano, and Roberto Petagine all had long, successful NPB careers. The Dominican third baseman José Fernández played eleven years in the NPB, compiling a .282 batting average with 206 home runs and 772 runs batted in.

Many of the most celebrated foreign players came to Japan after not finding success in the Major Leagues; see "Big in Japan".

Since the 1970s, foreigners have also made an impact in Nippon Professional Baseball's managing and coaching ranks, with Americans Bobby Valentine and Trey Hillman managing their respective teams to Japan Series championships.

Teams

Note: The Tokyo Yakult Swallows have plans to build a new stadium, located next to its current stadium, in 2030.

Franchise locations
Locations are listed from north to south. Only the most prominent names of each franchise are listed.

Champions

Awards

Nippon Professional Baseball Most Valuable Player Award
Nippon Professional Baseball Rookie of the Year Award
Nippon Professional Baseball Comeback Player of the Year Award
Eiji Sawamura Award (starting pitcher of the year)
Mitsui Golden Glove Award
Golden Spirit Award
Matsutaro Shoriki Award
Japan Series Most Valuable Player
Nippon Professional Baseball All-Star Game Most Valuable Player

Records

Single season batting

 a  Harimoto is a Korean citizen who was born and grew up in Japan (see Zainichi Korean).

 b  As all Curaçaoans have Dutch citizenship and Balentien has represented the Netherlands internationally, he is listed here as Dutch.

 c  Despite being born in Japan, Oh was a citizen of the Republic of China (his father's nationality) instead of Japan.

 d  Ramirez did not have Japanese citizenship until 2019 and so is listed as the nationality he was during his playing career.

Single season pitching

 d  The Japanese record is 0.73, set by Hideo Fujimoto in the 1943 Japanese Baseball League season, which is also the world record ERA, surpassing Tim Keefe's 0.86 of the Troy Trojans in 1880.

 e  The Japanese record is shared between Inao and Victor Starffin, who also recorded 42 wins during the 1942 Japanese Baseball League season.

 f  Despite being born in Japan, Kaneda did not become a Japanese citizen until 1959 and was instead a South Korean citizen.

Career batting

Career pitching

ERA champions

Perfect games

 †: 5th game of Japan Series; In NPB, no-hitters or perfect games achieved by multiple pitchers in one game are considered unofficial. However, it is recognized by the WBSC (World Baseball Softball Confederation, the international governing body of baseball) as a perfect game.

International play

Since 1986 an All-Star team from Major League Baseball (MLB) is sent to a biennial end-of-the-season tour of Japan, dubbed as MLB Japan All-Star Series, playing exhibition games in a best-of format against the All-Stars from NPB or recently as of 2014 the national team Samurai Japan.

The 2014 series also celebrated the 80th anniversary of the establishment of Japan's professional baseball by holding an exhibition game of a joint team of Hanshin Tigers and Yomiuri Giants against the MLB All-Stars at the Koshien Stadium on November 11, 2014.

Agreement and systems
 Nippon Professional Baseball Agreement
 Nippon Professional Baseball rosters
 Registration of players under control
 Developmental player system
 Nippon Professional Baseball draft

See also

Comparison of Major League Baseball and Nippon Professional Baseball
High school baseball in Japan
Japanese Baseball Hall of Fame
List of Japanese baseball players
List of Japanese players in Major League Baseball
Shikoku Island League Plus (Regional professional league)
 List of Nippon Professional Baseball mascots

References

Further reading

External links
 
  Official website
 Japan Baseball Hall of Fame and Museum
 MLB history of Puro Yakyū page 

 
1950 establishments in Japan
1
Sports leagues established in 1950
Professional sports leagues in Japan